The Toyota TF105/105B was a Formula One car for the 2005 Formula One season. The chassis was designed by Mike Gascoyne and Nicoló Petrucci with the engine being designed by Luca Marmorini. The year was statistically the team's most successful, with 88 points, five podium positions, and the fastest lap. The low-point was the withdrawal of the team from the 2005 United States Grand Prix, due to Michelin tyre safety concerns, as Ralf Schumacher's left front tyre deflated on Indianapolis's famous last corner in Friday practice and Schumacher crashed into the wall and had to be taken to hospital. Ricardo Zonta replaced him, but neither of the Toyotas started the race. The team eventually finished fourth in the Constructors' Championship, their best ever championship placing.

The TF105 featured a 3.0-litre Toyota RVX-05 V10 engine limited to 19,000 RPM, with a 7-speed sequential semi-automatic controlled via electro-hydraulic paddle-shift operation, plus reverse. The TF105 would become Toyota's best Formula 1 competitor in their history.

Development 

Work began on the design and manufacture of the TF105 shortly before the end of the 2004 season, as work had to be done on the engine to make sure that it would safely endure two race meetings, which was a requirement in the FIA regulations for 2005. Many elements of the car were entirely new. The car's design was supervised by Technical Director Mike Gascoyne, and the chassis was designed by Gustav Brunner.

Toyota's form shocked many in the F1 paddock, as the Toyota team claimed two second-place finishes in a row and 27 points in the first three races of the season. The car was driven to 88 points with the team, with 5 podium positions also being scored.

The introduction of the TF105B 
The car was updated to the TF105B for the 2005 Japanese Grand Prix. It was unique as it ran without a keel, and the suspension was mounted higher on the car than the TF105. It seemed to particularly suit Ralf Schumacher, as on its first outing, Ralf took pole at Suzuka, helped by his knowledge of the track from his Formula Nippon days. The TF105B was led to points finishes twice by Ralf Schumacher, with 7 points in total being scored with the car, including a podium in the 2005 Chinese Grand Prix.

TF105.5 
During the 2005 season, Toyota designed the RVX-06 V8 engine, which was used on the Toyota TF106 the following season. In order to test this new engine, the TF105 chassis was adapted to accommodate the V8 engine. The TF105.5 was driven by the team's test driver, Frenchman Olivier Panis who stated that the new V8 engine was 2.5 seconds slower than the V10 engine used by Toyota in 2005.

Previous indoor speed record
A TF105 set the previously nonexistent indoor speed record on an episode of Top Gear during the eighth series. The speed has since been broken by the American Top Gear host Tanner Foust with his Ford Fiesta Rallycross.

Complete Formula One results
(key) (results in bold indicate pole position, results in italics indicate fastest lap)

References

Toyota Formula One cars
2005 Formula One season cars